The 1987 Monaco Grand Prix (formally the 45e Grand Prix de Monaco) was a Formula One motor race held on 31 May 1987 at the Circuit de Monaco, Monte Carlo. It was the fourth race of the 1987 Formula One World Championship.

The 78-lap race was won by Ayrton Senna, driving a Lotus-Honda. It was the first of an eventual six wins for the Brazilian driver at Monaco. Compatriot Nelson Piquet was second in a Williams-Honda, with Italian Michele Alboreto third in a Ferrari.

The win promoted Senna to second in the Drivers' Championship, three points behind McLaren driver Alain Prost.

Race summary
Traditionally the number of competitors permitted for the Monaco Grand Prix was lower than at all other races, due to the tight and twisty nature of the Monte Carlo circuit. Originally 16, it was later increased to 20. For 1987, however, it was increased to a full grid of 26. According to FISA, this move was made in order to bring the race into line with the other races on the F1 calendar, but there were cynical views that it was made in order to reduce the number of non-qualifiers to appease team sponsors. There was widespread concern about the results of overcrowding on the track and the speed difference of various cars.

During the practice session, Michele Alboreto's Ferrari tangled with Christian Danner's slow-moving Zakspeed on the uphill section after the Ste-Devote corner. Alboreto's car was thrown in the air and caught fire, but landed back on the track. FISA blamed Danner for the accident and took the decision to exclude him from the weekend, the first such event in the history of the Formula One World Championship. There were widespread objections throughout the paddock, particularly as there were several other practice accidents and it was felt that Danner had no more to blame than any other driver involved in these accidents. Alboreto himself believed that Danner was not to blame for the accident.

Nigel Mansell took pole position in the Williams, with Ayrton Senna's Lotus alongside on the front row and Nelson Piquet third in the other Williams. At the start, Mansell led away from Senna, Piquet, Alboreto and Alain Prost in the McLaren. Mansell led until lap 30 when he retired with a loss of turbo boost; Senna then led for the remainder of the race; despite making a pit stop for tyres.

Senna eventually won by 33 seconds from Piquet. Prost was running third when his engine failed with three laps to go, promoting Alboreto to the final podium position. Gerhard Berger finished fourth in the other Ferrari, with the top six completed by the first two naturally-aspirated finishers, Jonathan Palmer in the Tyrrell and Ivan Capelli in the March.

Senna's victory was the first for a car with active suspension.

Classification

Qualifying

Race 
Numbers in brackets refer to positions of normally aspirated entrants competing for the Jim Clark Trophy.

Championship standings after the race

Drivers' Championship standings

Constructors' Championship standings

Jim Clark Trophy standings

Colin Chapman trophy standings

References

Monaco Grand Prix
Monaco Grand Prix
Grand Prix